Lillian Nordica (December 12, 1857 – May 10, 1914) was an American opera singer who had a major stage career in Europe and her native country.

Nordica established herself as one of the foremost dramatic sopranos of the late 19th and early 20th centuries. She had a powerful yet flexible voice and the ability to perform an unusually wide range of roles in the German, French and Italian operatic repertoires.

Early life and education
Lillian Allen Norton was born in 1857 in a small Cape Cod style farmhouse built by her grandfather on a hill in Farmington, Maine.

In her youth, Norton is said to have possessed an inherent fondness for music and the sounds of singing birds and running brooks. When she was eight her family moved to Boston, Massachusetts to continue the musical education of her sister Wilhelmina. Wilhelmina died before her 18th birthday. Family hopes were then pinned on Lillian, and her musical education began soon thereafter. She trained as a singer in Boston, graduating from the New England Conservatory in that city at the age of 18.

Career
She made her public debut at the conservatory as a soloist with the Handel and Haydn Society.

Convinced that she could forge a successful career as a professional performer, Norton travelled to Italy and put a final bel canto polish on her vocalism through study in Milan. "Nordica", a stage name, was bestowed by an Italian maestro at the beginning of her operatic career. He convinced her that European opera-goers would not tolerate a diva with a plain sounding, Anglo-American name. The adopted name, Giglia Nordica, meant "Lily of the North", but she soon became known as "Madame Nordica" or simply as "Nordica".

As Madame Nordica, she made her operatic debut at Brescia in 1879. She achieved a high rank among the international prima donnas of her era, appearing in many major musical venues in Western Europe and Russia. She sang for example at The Royal Opera House, Covent Garden, in 1887-93 and performed at the Bayreuth Festival in Germany in 1894 as Elsa in Lohengrin. In her native America she was particularly associated with the Metropolitan Opera in New York, where her frequent stage partner was the cultured Polish tenor Jean de Reszke. She sang at the Met from 1891 until 1910, with some breaks in between.

By all accounts Nordica possessed an extremely big, agile and pure-toned soprano voice which she was prepared to use unstintingly. (See, for instance, Michael Scott, The Record of Singing, Volume One, pp. 38–40.) An adventurous artist, she embraced an enormously varied repertoire which included, among many other works, Aida, Wagner's Ring Cycle (as Brünnhilde), Tristan und Isolde, Lohengrin, La traviata, Il trovatore, La Gioconda, Faust, Les Huguenots, Mignon and Le nozze di Figaro. She established her worldwide reputation as an opera singer of the first magnitude despite facing powerful competition during her career from a number of other outstanding dramatic sopranos. Her main rivals included Lilli Lehmann, Rosa Sucher, Katharina Klafsky, Milka Ternina, Therese Malten, Johanna Gadski, Félia Litvinne, Olive Fremstad, Anna von Mildenburg and Emmy Destinn.

She wrote a treatise called Hints to Singers. A copy is appended to her Yankee Diva biography.

By 1913, Nordica's voice and health were in decline. This did not prevent her from embarking misguidedly on a strenuous tour to Australia,  which proved to be her last.

Recordings
Nordica made a number of acoustic discs for Columbia Records. They were recorded comparatively late in her career, however, and are of a poor technical standard. Nevertheless, they do indicate her considerable range as a singer, for she is able to perform both coloratura showpieces (such as "Io son Titania" from Mignon) and dramatic Wagnerian solos (such as "Mild und leise" from Tristan und Isolde). Her best known record is probably that of a demanding aria from the Hungarian opera Hunyadi Laszlo by Ferenc Erkel, which she cut in 1907. Nordica can be also heard briefly in some of the Mapleson Cylinders that were recorded during actual performances at the Metropolitan Opera House during the first few years of the 20th century. The sound of these cylinders is primitive but the impressive size of Nordica's voice can be better appreciated as it rings out in a theatre acoustic. A CD of her gramophone and cylinder recordings was released by Marston Records in 2003, complete with extensive liner notes dealing with Nordica's voice and career (see below).

Personal life
Nordica's successful operatic career contrasted with her disastrous personal life. Nordica wed three times.

In 1882, she retired from the stage to marry Frederick A. Gower, whom she sued for divorce in 1885, but who disappeared at about the time of the suit, probably having been killed in a balloon accident. Her second marriage was in 1896 to a Hungarian tenor named Zoltán Döhme. He took the title role in Parsifal at Bayreuth in 1894. She obtained a divorce from him in 1904. Her third marriage was in 1909 to a wealthy New York banker, George W. Young, but it also proved unhappy.

Women's Suffrage
She was also a vocal supporter of women’s rights. She spoke out against the pay gap between male and female singers. She raised funds for the women’s suffrage movement by giving concerts.  She spoke from an open streetcar in San Francisco, encouraging women to vote, one day before the vote for the women’s right in California.

In 1910 she wrote a full page article for the New York Times.  In it she championed the Women's Suffrage cause.

Death
She nearly missed the ship  departing Sydney after her 1913 Australian concert tour, but wired the captain asking him to wait for her. It would prove to be a fatal mistake. The Tasman hit a coral reef, where it remained for three days, and Nordica suffered hypothermia (exposure) from which she never recovered.  She was taken to Thursday Island, Queensland, where she was hospitalised for some time.  There she befriended a small American boy who was taken ill while on a different vessel passing through Torres Strait.  After his death, Nordica installed a gravestone in the local cemetery in his memory.  She was well enough on Thursday Island to make a new will, which disinherited her husband.  (The Australian poet and novelist Thomas Shapcott dramatised these events in his 1998 novel Theatre of Darkness.) She was then transferred to Batavia in the Dutch East Indies (now Jakarta, Indonesia). She lingered for months, seeming to improve, only to fail again. She died of pneumonia on May 10, 1914, in Batavia.

Legacy
Her birthplace in Farmington, Maine, is today the Nordica Homestead, a museum and historic site. Nordica Auditorium in Merrill Hall at the University of Maine at Farmington is named after her.

References

Bibliography

Attribution

Further reading
 Kennebec Maine Journal, Music, Augusta, Maine, Historical Series, VI of VI, October 23, 1976, Page 7.
 Syracuse Herald, Lillian Nordica's Voice is Stilled by Death on Other Side of the Globe, Far From Her Friends, Monday Evening, May 11, 1914, Page 5.
 The Great Singers, by Henry Pleasants, fourth edition (Macmillan Publishing, London, 1983).
 The Record of Singing, Volume One, by Michael Scott (Duckworth, London, 1977).

External links

 Nordica Memorial Association and Nordica Homestead Museum, Farmington, Maine
 Marston Records has reissued all the known Lillian Nordica recordings on a CD set.
 Slide show of images related to Lillian Nordica from the Maine Memory Network
 Lillian Nordica, North American Theater Online, Bio and photos
 Haunt in The University of Maine at Farmington 116 South St Farmington, Me 04938 Farmington, MAINE Franklin Haunt
 

1857 births
1914 deaths
American operatic sopranos
People from Farmington, Maine
19th-century American women opera singers
American stage actresses
Deaths from pneumonia in Indonesia
University of Maine at Farmington
New England Conservatory alumni
Burials at Bayview – New York Bay Cemetery